Velo is a town and a former municipality in Corinthia, Peloponnese, Greece. Since the 2011 local government reform it is part of the municipality Velo-Vocha, of which it is a municipal unit. The municipal unit has an area of 76.952 km2. It is situated on the Gulf of Corinth coast, about 15 km west from Corinth, and 5 km southeast of Kiato. Greek National Road 8, the old Corinth-Patras highway, passes through the town.

The community has an elementary school, a secondary school, a semi-professional soccer team named Ellas Velou and a square called 'Liberty square'.

Subdivisions
The municipal unit Velo is subdivided into the following communities (constituent villages in brackets):
 Velo (Velo, Sataiika)
 Ellinochori
 Kokkoni
 Krines
 Nerantza
 Poulitsa
 Stimagka
 Tarsina

Historical population

Notable people 
Stathis Psaltis, actor
Alexis Kougias, lawyer
Tryfon Papoutsis, actor

See also
List of settlements in Corinthia

References

External links
GTP - Velo
GTP - Municipality of Velo
Our Homeland ( www.pelopas.webs.com)

Populated places in Corinthia